Ulakh-An (Uulaax-Aan) is a rural locality (a selo), the only inhabited locality, and the administrative center of Zhersky Rural Okrug of Khangalassky District in the Sakha Republic, Russia, located  from Pokrovsk, the administrative center of the district. Its population as of the 2010 Census was 838, up from 834 recorded during the 2002 Census.

References

Notes

Sources
Official website of the Sakha Republic. Registry of the Administrative-Territorial Divisions of the Sakha Republic. Khangalassky District. 

Rural localities in Khangalassky District